Craig Ochs (born August 20, 1981) is a former American football quarterback for the San Diego Chargers and Buffalo Bills in the NFL and was also assigned to the Frankfurt Galaxy of NFL Europe in the 2006 season.

Biography
Ochs played high school football at Fairview High School in Boulder, Colorado, where he earned All-American honors. He began his college football career with the Colorado Buffaloes in 2000.  At the time, Ochs was considered one of the top young quarterbacks in Division I.  After he was sidelined due to a string of concussions, Ochs decided to transfer to the University of Montana and play for the Division I-AA Montana Grizzlies.  In his senior season of 2004, Ochs rated among the top I-AA quarterbacks and led the Grizzlies to the national title game.

Going into 2005, Ochs was tabbed as a borderline draft pick. He went undrafted, however, in the 2005 NFL Draft. Ochs signed on to play with the San Diego Chargers soon after the draft but was cut on August 25, 2005, before the regular season began. Ochs tried out with the Buffalo Bills during the NFL regular season but did not get an offer to sign with the team.  He was also sought out by the Winnipeg Blue Bombers of the CFL, but held out for another NFL opportunity.

Eventually, Buffalo offered Ochs a two-year contract after the season ended on January 9, 2006, as the team's third-string quarterback.  The Bills allocated Ochs to the Frankfurt Galaxy in NFL Europa on January 19, 2006.  On April 22, 2006, he got his first start for the Galaxy, leading Frankfurt to an 18–17 comeback win over the Berlin Thunder. Ochs led Frankfurt to a 7–3 record and a World Bowl title in 2006.

Ochs suffered an injury in May 2006 and is currently an assistant coach on offense for the University of Montana.

College stats

Pro stats 

1981 births
Living people
American football quarterbacks
Buffalo Bills players
Colorado Buffaloes football players
Frankfurt Galaxy players
Montana Grizzlies football players
Players of American football from Colorado Springs, Colorado